Gogaji (also known as Goga, Jahar Veer Gogga, Gugga, Gugga Pir, Gugga Jaharpir, Gugga Chohan, Gugga Rana, Gugga Bir and Raja Mandlik) is a folk deity, worshipped in the northern states of India especially in Rajasthan, Himachal Pradesh, Haryana, Uttarakhand, Punjab region, Uttar Pradesh, Jammu and Gujarat. He is a warrior-hero of the region, venerated as a saint and a 'snake-god'.

Although there are references to him in the folklore of Rajasthan, little historical knowledge of Gugga exists other than that he ruled the small kingdom of Dadrewa (in present day Rajasthan) and was a contemporary of Prithviraj Chauhan.

Etymology
According to legend, Goga was born with the blessings of Guru Gorakhnath, who gave 'Gugal' fruit to Goga's mother Bachhal which was used to name him. Another belief is that he was called Goga because of his remarkable service to cows(Gou in Sanskrit).

Kingdom 
Goga had a kingdom called Bagad Dedga near Ganganagar that spanned over to Hansi near Hisar in Haryana and included territory up to the river Sutlej in Punjab.  It is believed that Goga lived during the 12th Century AD  In the past, the river Sutlej flowed through the district of Bathinda in present-day Punjab in India. The capital was at Dadrewa near Ganganagar.

Legends

Family
Goga (Rajasthani: (Gugo) गुग्गो) was born in c. 900 AD to queen Bachchal (the daughter of a Rajput ruler, Kanwarpala who in 1173 AD ruled over Sirsa in present-day Haryana) and king Zewar in Dadrewa of the Chauhan Clan in the Churu district of Rajasthan. The earliest parts of Goga's life were spent in the village of Dadrewa, situated on Hissar—Bikaner highway in Sadulpur tehsil of Churu district in Rajasthan. According to other legends, his father was Vachha Chauhan, the Raja of Jangal Desh, which stretched from the Sutlej to Haryana.

Birth
When Bachal was worshipping Gorakhnath, her twin-sister decided to usurp the blessings from the Gorakhnath. In the middle of the night, she wore her sister's clothes and deceived Gorakhnath into giving her the blessing fruit. When Bachal realised it, she rushed to Gorakhnath and said that she had not received anything. To this, Gorakhnath replied that he had already given his blessings and said that her sister was attempting to deceive her. After repeated requests by Bachal, Gorakhnath relented and gave her two Gugal candies. She distributed these candies to ladies having no child, including the 'blue mare' who was pregnant at that time. When the Guru gave the blessing to Bachal, he foretold that her son would become very powerful and would rule over the other two sons of their aunt,  Kachal.

Marriage
Goga was married to Shreeyal Roz who was daughter of Tandul Nagari's King Sindha Singh.

Other
Another story is that Arjan and Sarjan were against Goga and was a part of conspiracy with king Anangpal Tomar of Delhi. King Anganpal attacked bagad region with Arjan and Sarjan. Both of them were killed by Goga. Goga spared the king after his miserere. In a quarrel about land he killed his two brothers on which account he drew upon himself the anger of his mother.

Celebration and fairs
The history of Goga falls within folk religion and therefore his followers include people from all faiths. Goga is popular as a Devta who protects his followers from snakes and other evils. He has been deified as a snake demigod and is a prominent figure among those who follow the Nāga cult in what is now Rajasthan and since the seventeenth century has been worshipped in the Western Himalayas also, possibly as a consequence of migration there from Rajasthan.

He is particularly popular among those engaged in agrarian pursuits, for whom the fear of snakebite is common. Although a Hindu, he has many Muslim devotees and is chiefly considered to be a saint (pir) who had the power to cure the effects of poison (jahar).

He was reputed to be a disciple of Guru Gorakhnath. According to Muslim oral tradition prevalent in Punjab, he learnt the way of entering and leaving solid earth by a Muslim Pir Hazi Rattan of Bathinda. Goga is also believed to have lived for some time in Bathinda.

The cult is prevalent in Rajasthan and other states of northern India, including Punjab, Haryana, Himachal Pradesh and the north western districts of Uttar Pradesh. His followers can also be found in Gujarat and Madhya Pradesh.

Rajasthan
His shrine, referred as medi (shortened colloquial term for Samādhi), consists of a one-room building with a minaret on each corner and a Hindu grave inside, marked by a Nishan (a symbol or sign), which is made up of a long bamboo with peacock plumes, a coconut, some colored threads and some handpankhas with a blue flag on the top.

Worship of Goga starts in Bhaadra month of Hindu calendar. On the 9th of Bhadra, the people worship his symbol, a black snake painted on a wall. Worshippers take a fly-flap, known as chhari, round the village. Devotees pay their respect to it and offer churma. The Savayians sing devotional songs known as ‘Pir ke Solle’ in his honour to the accompaniment of deroos. Beating of deroos is the exclusive privilege of the Savayian community; others may sing, dance or offer charhawa. It is believed that the spirit of Gugga temporarily takes abode in the devotee dancer who lashes himself with a bunch of iron chains. People also open their rakhis on this day(bhadra krishna paksh navmi) and offer them to him. They also offer sweet puri (a type of sweet chappati) and other sweets and take his blessing.

Grand fairs are held at samadhi sathal Gogamedi. Gogamedi is 359 km from Jaipur, in Hanumangarh district of Rajasthan. It is believed that Goga went into samādhi at Gogamedi. Thousands of devotees gather to pay homage at this memorial annually in the month of Bhadrapada during the Goga fair, which lasts for three days. The fair is held from the ninth day of the dark half of Bhadrapada (Goga Navami) to the eleventh day of the dark half of the same month. People sing and dance to the beats of drums with multicoloured flags called nishans in their hands. The songs and bhajans on the life history of Gogaji are recited accompanied by music played with traditional instruments like Damru, Chimta, etc. At his birthplace Dadrewa, the fair goes on over a month. Devotees from far eastern places of Dadrewa start arriving from the beginning of the auspicious month of Bhaadra. These devotees are commonly known as purbia (those who belong to east). It is a common sight to see people with snakes lying around their necks. According to a folklore in and around his birthplace Dadrewa it is believed that if someone picks up even a stick from johra (a barren land which has a sacred pond in Dadrewa), it would turn into a snake. Devotees of Gogaji worship him when they get a snake bite and apply sacred ash (bhabhoot) on the bite as an immediate remedy.

Himachal Pradesh
In Thaneek Pura, Himachal Pradesh, a very large scale festival and fair is organized on Gugga Navami. The tale of Gugga Ji is recited, from Raksha Bandhan to Gugga Naumi, by the followers who visit every house in the region. These followers while singing the tales of Gugga Ji carry a Chhat (a wooden umbrella) and people offer them grains and other stuff. They bring all the collected offerings to the temple and then the grand festival of Gugga Navami is celebrated for three days. Apart from various pujas and rituals, the wrestling competition (Mall or Dangal) is organized for three days where participants from all over the region compete. The annual three-day fair is also a part of these festivities where people come and enjoy great food, and shop for decorative items, handicrafts, clothes, cosmetics, household goods, and toys for children.

Punjab
Goga is known as Gugga in the Punjab who has a significant following. Many Punjabi villages have a shrine dedicated to Gugga. A fair is organised annually in the village of Chhapar and is known as the Chhapar Mela. Gugga's legacy in Punjab can be seen in towns such as Bareta Mandi, which is situated at a distance of 51 km from Mansa in Punjab. "The town is predominantly inhabited by Chauhans who trace their origin from Gugga, ‘Lord of Snakes’. It is said that nobody has ever died here on account of snakebite because of the blessings of Gugga."

In the Punjab region, it is traditional to offer sweet Vermicelli to the shrines of Gugga Ji and sweet fried bread (mathya). He is worshiped in the month of Bhadon especially on the ninth day of that month. Gugga is meant to protect against snake bites and he is venerated in shrines known as marris. The shrines do not conform to any religion and can range from antholes to structures that resemble a Sikh Gurdwara or a Mosque. When worshipping Gugga, people bring noodles as offerings and also leave them in places where snakes reside. People perform a devotional dance while dancing on the legendary songs of bravery sung in his praise.

On the day of Gugga naumi, when offering the sweet dish, songs are sung which include:

Punjabi:
ਪੱਲੇ ਮੇਰੇ ਮਥੀਆਂ
ਨੀ ਮੈਂ ਗੁੱਗਾ ਮਨਾਓੁਣ ਚੱਲੀਆਂ
ਨੀ  ਮੈਂ ਬਾਰੀ ਗੁੱਗਾ ਜੀ

Palle mere mathyaa
ni mein Gugga manaun challyaa
ni mein bari Gugga ji

Translation
I have got mathya
I am going to worship Gugga ji
Oh Gugga ji

See also 
Dadrewa
Chauhan
Thaneek Pura

References

Bibliography

Folk deities of Rajasthan
Regional Hindu gods
Hindu folk deities
Punjabi folklore
Punjabi folk religion
Punjabi culture